Sarrocchi is a surname of Italian origin. People with the surname include:

Gino Sarrocchi (1870–1950), Italian lawyer and politician
Giulio Sarrocchi (1887–1971), Italian fencer
Margherita Sarrocchi (c. 1560–1617), Italian poetess 
Tito Sarrocchi (1824–1900), Italian sculptor 

Surnames of Italian origin